Antonio de Jesús Cruz Torres (born 30 October 1957) is a businessman and politician from the Dominican Republic. He is Senator for the province of Santiago Rodríguez, elected in 2006, and re-elected in 2010.

References 

Living people
1957 births
People from Santiago Rodríguez Province
Dominican Liberation Party politicians
Dominican Republic people of Spanish descent
Dominican Republic businesspeople
Members of the Senate of the Dominican Republic
White Dominicans